Ednan Aslan (born on November 7, 1959 in Bayburt) is an Austrian-Turkish scholar of Islam and professor of Islamic religious education at the University of Vienna.

Biography
Aslan was born on November 7, 1959 in Bayburt, Turkey. Aslan graduated from the University of Applied Sciences in Esslingen in 1988. He studied pedagogy and political science at the Universities of Tübingen and Stuttgart from 1990 to 1992. In 1996, he received his doctorate for his research on the religious education of Muslim children in Austria and Germany. Aslan has been a professor of Islamic religious education at the University of Vienna's Institute of Educational Science since 2008.

Works
 Religion and Violence: Muslim and Christian Theological and Pedagogical Reflections

References

Turkish scholars of Islam
Living people
Academic staff of the University of Vienna
1959 births
Muslim scholars of Islamic studies